
Yawarqucha (Quechua yawar blood qucha lake, "blood lake", hispanicized spelling Yahuarcocha) is a lake in Peru located in the Huánuco Region, Huacaybamba Province, Huacaybamba District. Yawarqucha lies southeast of the larger lake Mamaqucha of the Pinra District.

References 

Lakes of Peru
Lakes of Huánuco Region